Aagje is a feminine Dutch given name. Notable people with this name include:
 Aagje Vanwalleghem (born 1987), Belgian gymnast.
 Aagje Deken (1741–1804), Dutch writer.
 Ada Kok (born 1947), former Dutch swimmer.